The RS Media is another product in WowWee's line of biomorphic robots, based on a walking system designed by Mark Tilden. The RS Media uses basically the same body as the Robosapien V2, but a different brain based on a Linux kernel. As the name implies, the RS Media's focus is on multimedia capabilities, including the ability to record and playback audio, pictures and video. he retains and builds upon the Robosapien V2's sensor array and programmability.

Hardware 
 Two primary processors:
 200MHz ARM9 with 64MB of flash RAM for the primary LINUX operating system and user files
 Custom 16 bit processor for handling the biomorphic robot functions
 16MB (2006 Model) or 32MB (2007 Model) of RAM
 1 USB port
 Stereo audio plug
 SD card slot (accepts up to 1GB cards)
 VGA color camera in the forehead for image recognition, and video recording
 20kHz microphone in the chest for audio recording
 1.9" 176x132 pixel color TFT supertwist LCD screen in his chest
 11W 3-speaker system (2 x metal speakers + 1 back-mounted woofer)
 Power-adapter port in foot
 14 motors based on the configuration found in the Robosapien V2, providing 11 degrees of freedom
2 motors in each leg
2 motors for his head
3 motors in each hand
2 hip motors

Sensors 
 3 infrared (IR) detectors that use IR ranging for object detection
 VGA quality camera in its forehead for video and human-tracking abilities
 3 sound sensors for sound localization and audio recording
 2 touch sensors on the back of each hand
 1 toe and 1 heel touch sensor in each foot

Software 
Unlike previous products in WowWee's Robo line of products, the RS Media is the first to feature bundled PC software. There are 4 applications: the BodyCon Editor, the Personality Editor, the Macro Editor, and the Media Organizer. 

BodyCon Editor:
The BodyCon Editor allows the user to customize and preview the RS Media movements. The user can create a sequence of movements as well as voice and sound effects and save everything in a file for playback in the future. This file can also be included in a personality or to a user-created Macro.

Personality Editor:
The RS Media expands on the single personality that original Robosapien models came with, and comes with 4 different personalities (see below for more information). It also allows you to create your own personality from scratch.

Macro Editor:
The Macro Editor is actually a subcomponent of the Personality Editor, but it warrants its own description. The user can create their own macros which are sequences of commands that the RS Media can execute. Macros can also include conditional routines that are based on environmental or user feedback. 

Media Organizer:
The Media Organizer gives the user a GUI interface to manage the audio, images, video, games, and personalities on the RS Media. Files can be uploaded, downloaded, deleted and moved around. The robot would need to be connected to the computer running the Media Organizer software using a USB cable.

3rd Party Software, Themes, and Utilities 
There is some 3rd Party Software that people have developed to make using the RS Media easier.

RSM Remote:
It allows you to control most of RS Media's functions and even take a video, photo or audio recording, as well as tell him to track a certain color, all from a PC.

iMedia Screen Theme:
iMedia is an iPhone inspired theme for RS Media.
It replaces pictures for Control Mode, Arm Mode, Guard Mode and all Media Mode related pictures.

RS Media Time Sync:
A handy little app which will automatically synchronize your RSMedia's time with your PC's, without the hassle of setting it via the USB or Serial Console.

RS Media Tango! Screen Theme:
Unleash the Linux in your RSMedia with this Tango!/GNOME screen theme. Includes graphics for Control Mode, Arm Mode Guard Mode, All Program Modes, as well as Media Mode animations which fade in and out as you scroll through them.

More info and Download links for these things can be found at the Computers 'n' More Blog.

More Utilities, Themes and Software can also be found at Computers 'n' More

Personalities 
A personality is a collection of the RS Media's audio responses. The RS Media ships with 4 personalities that the user can switch among using the remote control:

 RS Media (default)
 Service Bot 3000 - an English butler.
 Space Bot - a fictional space captain
 Billy-Joe Sapien - a cowboy

Users may also modify the existing personalities or create their own from scratch.

Multimedia features 
The RS Media is capable of recording and playing MP3's, MPEG4's, JPEG's, as well as Java applications. It comes with 3 Java games that are controlled with the remote control and displayed to its LCD screen. It can also be used as an audio player via the stereo line-in port. The built-in memory can be supplemented by inserting an SD memory card (up to 1GB in size) into the SD slot.

Programming 
Like other WowWee robots, the RS Media can be programmed to execute sequences of moves and audio clips either as a standalone program or as a reaction to a sound, touch or visual stimulus. The RS Media has the same programming mode as the V2, Puppet Mode, where the user can manually bend and move the robot's body parts to create a program. The most sophisticated way to program the RS Media is by use of the computer applications.

Hacking 
As with other Robosapien models, the RS Media was designed with the possibility for modifications. In reference to the philosophy behind the 'hackability' of the robots, Tilden once said, "Years ago some bright AI lads asked if I could build a competent humanoid cradle into which they could put their smart programs.  Took me a while, but here it is lads, inexpensive and ready to go right out of the box.  Make it think, and let me know how it goes."

In spring of 2009, Helibot from the RoboCommunity has created a new driver to allow access to the Robot's Linux operating system via the USB port and a terminal program. This is now a part of the RSMedia Development Kit which is now available on SourceForge.
Applications for RS Media can be found at the RobotAppStore

Availability 
The RS Media was released in October 2006 in Australia and the UK.

References

External links 
RS Media at WowWee

Entertainment robots
Bipedal humanoid robots
WowWee
2006 robots